The Night Shift is an American medical drama television series created by Gabe Sachs and Jeff Judah that premiered May 27, 2014 on NBC, and the series finale aired on August 31, 2017. The series starred Eoin Macken, Jill Flint, Ken Leung, Brendan Fehr, Daniella Alonso, Robert Bailey Jr., Jeananne Goossen, J.R. Lemon, and Freddy Rodriguez as the staff who work the late night shift in the ER at San Antonio Medical Center. On November 17, 2016, NBC renewed the series for a fourth season, which premiered on June 22, 2017. The series was cancelled on October 13, 2017, after four seasons.

Series overview

Episodes

Season 1 (2014)

Season 2 (2015)

Season 3 (2016)

Season 4 (2017)

References

External links
 
 

Lists of American drama television series episodes